Anostomus ternetzi is a fish in the family Anostomidae.

Etymology
The fish is named in honor of ichthyologist and naturalist Carl Ternetz (1870-1928), who collected the type specimen.

Description
Max length : 12.0 cm TL male/unsexed.

Distribution
South America:  Orinoco, Araguaia and Amazon River basins; coastal rivers of Guianas.

References

Anostomidae
Fish of South America
Taxa named by Augustín Fernández-Yépez
Fish described in 1949